Pelenna was an electoral ward coterminous with the Pelenna community in Neath Port Talbot county borough, south Wales.  The ward consisted of some or all of the following areas: Cefn-Saeson, Tonmawr, Pontrhydyfen in the parliamentary constituency of Neath.

Pelenna was bounded by the wards of: Resolven to the north; Cymmer to the east; Bryn and Cwmavon to the south; Briton Ferry East and Cimla to the west; and Tonna to the northwest.  The ward comprises open moorland to the north west and dense woodland to the south east with the largest settlements in Tonmawr and Pontrhydyfen.

Following a 2020 boundary review by the Local Democracy and Boundary Commission for Wales, Pelenna was merged with the neighbouring Cimla ward to become 'Cimla and Pelenna', effective from the 2022 local elections.

Local election results
In the 2017 local council elections, the electorate turnout for Pelenna was %.  The results were:

In 2019, the sitting Councillor, Martin Ellis, died.  On 20 June 2019, a by-election was held.  The results were:

References

External links
Pelenna Community Council website

Former wards of Neath Port Talbot